Daimler Buses North America (DBNA) was Daimler's North America bus division, incorporating the Orion, Setra, and Dodge Sprinter brands. Due to the spinoff of Daimler's truck division on December 1, 2021, it merged into Daimler Truck North America.

History

In 1999, Thomas Dennis was formed as a joint venture between Thomas Built Buses of the United States (51%) and Dennis of England (49%).

If manufactured a version of the Dennis Dart, engineered for the North American market, in a new facility located in Greensboro, North Carolina. The SLF200 was reengineered in 2002 to use a Mercedes-Benz engine and electrics. Dennis had hoped to develop a 40 ft transit bus, but instead DaimlerChrysler subsequently bought Orion Bus Industries. As a result, Mayflower terminated the joint venture, selling its 49 per cent interest to partner DaimlerChrysler. Mayflower stated it wanted to concentrate on double-deckers, citing the success of their double-decker fleets in New York and Vancouver.

Thomas Dennis was renamed DaimlerChrysler Commercial Buses North America in 2003.

In 2007 the company changed its name from DaimlerChrysler Commercial Buses North America to Daimler Buses North America after Daimler-Benz and Chrysler Corporation Demerged and parted ways when Daimler-Benz sold the Chrysler Corporation to Cerberus Capital Management.

Models
SLF200-series (SLF229, SLF232, SLF235) - Powered by diesel or compressed natural gas, discontinued in 2005
CL100 cutaway bus
Sprinter
Setra S and SG series
Orion V
Orion VI
Orion VII

References

External links
DaimlerChrysler Buses North America

Bus manufacturers of the United States
Companies based in Greensboro, North Carolina
Daimler Truck
Dennis Group
Motor vehicle assembly plants in North Carolina
Vehicle manufacturing companies established in 1999
1999 establishments in North Carolina